Kouvaras is a village and a former community in East Attica, Greece. Since the 2011 local government reform it is part of the municipality Saronikos, of which it is a municipal unit. The municipal unit has an area of 24.371 km2.

Geography

Kouvaras is situated in the southeastern part of the Attica peninsula. There are several low mountains around Kouvaras, including  to its southwest and Merenta to its north. It is 2 km north of Keratea, 4 km southeast of Kalyvia Thorikou and 27 km southeast of Athens city centre. The Greek National Road 89 (Gerakas - Koropi - Lavrio - Sounio) passes southwest of the town. The municipal unit Kouvaras also includes the village Neos Kouvaras (pop. 566), 1 km to the southwest and the villages of Hagia Katerina and Fussa.

Historical population

Historical monuments 
The church of St. George. A wall painting monument (1743) of Georgios Markou the Argus, the great and prolific post-Byzantine ecclesiastic iconographer of the 18th century (".... San Giorgio (agiografia su gli anni 1743), che si trova al paesino di Cuvara, dell 'Attica...." Evangelos Andreou http://ketlib.lib.unipi.gr/xmlui/handle/ket/849

References

External links
Official website 
GTP Travel Pages (community)
News

Populated places in East Attica